Brian Glen Banks (born September 28, 1970), is an American former professional baseball player. Banks hails from Mountain View High School and played first base, outfield, and catcher from –. He played for the Florida Marlins and Milwaukee Brewers of Major League Baseball (MLB). Banks was a part of the 2003 World Series Champion Florida Marlins. He retired from professional baseball on August 20, 2004.

Following his baseball career, Brian returned to school and graduated in 2011 from the Arizona School of Dentistry and Oral Health. Dr. Banks is currently the owner/operator of Banks Pediatric Dentistry, banksdental.com in Gilbert, Arizona.

Banks is a member of the Church of Jesus Christ of Latter-day Saints.

References

External links

1970 births
Living people
Albuquerque Isotopes players
American expatriate baseball players in Canada
American expatriate baseball players in Japan
Baseball players from Arizona
Beloit Brewers players
Calgary Cannons players
El Paso Diablos players
Florida Marlins players
Fukuoka Daiei Hawks players
Helena Brewers players
Iowa Cubs players
Latter Day Saints from Arizona
Louisville Redbirds players
Louisville RiverBats players
Major League Baseball first basemen
Major League Baseball left fielders
Major League Baseball right fielders
Milwaukee Brewers players
New Orleans Zephyrs players
Sportspeople from Mesa, Arizona
Stockton Ports players
Tucson Toros players